The 1998 Bolton Metropolitan Borough Council election took place on 7 May 1998 to elect members of Bolton Metropolitan Borough Council in Greater Manchester, England. One third of the council was up for election and the Labour Party kept overall control of the council.

20 seats were contested in the election, with 15 being held by Labour, 3 by the Liberal Democrats and 2 by the Conservatives. The 3 main parties contested all of the 20 seats, with 3 Socialist Labour Party and 4 other candidates standing.

The election saw the lowest turnout in at least 30 years at 23.5%, a significant drop from the 36.8% turnout in the 1996 election. Farnworth ward saw the lowest turnout at 15%, while the highest was 32.6% in Astley Bridge. The Conservatives gained 2 seats in the election to become the main opposition party on the council again. They gained Astley Bridge and Bradshaw wards from Labour, having defeated the Labour candidate in Bradshaw by 2 votes after 5 recounts. However Labour held on in Kearsley by 8 votes and won Westhoughton from the Liberal Democrats to remain firmly in control of the council.

After the election, the composition of the council was:
Labour 47
Conservative 8
Liberal Democrat 5

Election result

Council Composition
Prior to the election the composition of the council was:

After the election the composition of the council was:

LD - Liberal Democrats

Ward results

Astley Bridge ward

Blackrod ward

Bradshaw ward

Breightmet ward

Bromley Cross ward

Burnden ward

Central ward

Daubhill ward

Deane-cum-Heaton ward

Derby ward

Farnworth ward

Halliwell ward

Harper Green ward

Horwich ward

Hulton Park ward

Kearsley ward

Little Lever ward

Smithills ward

Tonge ward

Westhoughton ward

Sources

Notes

References
 

1998
1998 English local elections
1990s in Greater Manchester